Focus X (also known as X) is the eleventh studio album by the Dutch progressive rock band Focus, released on 5 November 5, 2012 by Eastworld Recordings.

Background
Focus X is the group's first studio album in six years. The album features Menno Gootjes on guitar, replacing Niels van der Steenhoven, who played guitar on the ensemble's previous album Focus 9 / New Skin (2009). The Japanese edition contains two bonus tracks, "Santa Teresa", and a live version of the band's successful 1971 single, "Hocus Pocus". The album generally received positive reviews. The cover art is designed and painted by Roger Dean.

Track listing

Personnel
 Thijs van Leer – Hammond organ, flute, vocoder, spoken vocals (tracks 1, 7, 11)
 Pierre van der Linden – drums, percussion
 Menno Gootjes – guitar, acoustic guitars (track 8)
 Bobby Jacobs – bass guitar, pro ducting and mixing
 Ivan Lins – vocals (tracks 6, 11)
 Berenice van Leer – vocals (track 10)
 Geert Scheijgrond - producing and mixing

References

External links 
 http://www.focus10.net
 http://www.focustheband.com

Focus (band) albums
Albums with cover art by Roger Dean (artist)
2012 albums